George Tate may refer to:

 George Tate (sports executive), American sports executive who owned the Cleveland Tate Stars baseball franchise
 George Tate (topographer) (1805–1871), English topographer, antiquarian and naturalist
 George Henry Hamilton Tate (1894–1953), English-born American zoologist and botanist
 George Tate, founder of Ashton-Tate, a US-based software company
 George Passman Tate (1856–?), authority on the history of Afghanistan